N-acetylglucosaminyldiphosphodolichol N-acetylglucosaminyltransferase (UDP-GlcNAc:dolichyl-pyrophosphoryl-GlcNAc GlcNAc transferase, uridine diphosphoacetylglucosamine-dolichylacetylglucosamine pyrophosphate acetylglucosaminyltransferase, N,N'-diacetylchitobiosylpyrophosphoryldolichol synthase) is an enzyme with systematic name UDP-N-acetyl-D-glucosamine:N-acetyl-D-glucosaminyl-diphosphodolichol N-acetyl-D-glucosaminyltransferase. This enzyme catalyses the following chemical reaction

 UDP-N-acetyl-D-glucosamine + N-acetyl-D-glucosaminyl-diphosphodolichol  UDP + N,N'-diacetylchitobiosyl-diphosphodolichol

References

External links 
 

EC 2.4.1